Sybra arcifera is a species of beetle in the family Cerambycidae. It was described by Pascoe in 1865.

References

arcifera
Beetles described in 1865